is a former Japanese football player.

Playing career
Matsukawa was born in Kanagawa Prefecture on April 18, 1973. After graduating from Komazawa University, he joined J1 League club Bellmare Hiratsuka in 1996. From 1997, he played many matches as central midfielder every season. In 1999 season, the club finished at bottom place and was relegated to J2 League. In 2000, he moved to Kyoto Purple Sanga. However he could not play many matches and the club was relegated to J2. In 2001, he played many matches and the club won the champions and returned to J1 in a year. However he could hardly play in the match in 2002. In August 2002, he moved to Consadole Sapporo. However he could hardly play in the match and the club was relegated to J2. In 2003, he moved to Japan Football League club YKK. He retired end of 2003 season.

Club statistics

References

External links

sports.geocities.jp

1973 births
Living people
Komazawa University alumni
Association football people from Kanagawa Prefecture
Japanese footballers
J1 League players
J2 League players
Japan Football League players
Shonan Bellmare players
Kyoto Sanga FC players
Hokkaido Consadole Sapporo players
Kataller Toyama players
Association football midfielders